The Taiwan Question and China's Reunification in the New Era is a white paper published by the Taiwan Affairs Office and State Council Information Office of the People's Republic of China (PRC). It is the first white paper concerning Taiwan  published since 2000 and was released a few days after Nancy Pelosi’s 2022 visit to Taiwan. In it, the PRC urged for Taiwan to reunify with it under the "one country, two systems" principle.

Taiwan's Mainland Affairs Council said the document was "wishful thinking and disregarding facts”.

See also 

 Chinese unification

References 

2022 documents
White papers
2022 in China
Cross-Strait relations